Silent Spring is a 1962 book written by Rachel Carson.

Silent Spring may also refer to:
Silent Spring (composition), a 2011 symphonic poem
Silent Spring Institute, a nonprofit organization
"The Numbers", a Radiohead song formerly known as Silent Spring
Rachel Carson Playground, also known as Silent Spring Park